Zabelskoye is a rural locality (a selo) in Alataninsky Selsoviet, Sterlitamaksky District, Bashkortostan, Russia. The population was 200 as of 2010. There are 3 streets.

Geography 
Zabelskoye is located 26 km northeast of Sterlitamak (the district's administrative centre) by road. Alatana is the nearest rural locality.

References 

Rural localities in Sterlitamaksky District